Lindsay Megan Pagano (born June 22, 1986) is an American singer who until 2003 was signed to Warner Brothers Records. She toured with Dream Street and Aaron Carter for several months. She also performed for the governor of California along with The Eagles and the Backstreet Boys.

She is mostly known for her 2001 song "Everything U R", which was originally on an AOL commercial before being the theme song for the WB show Maybe It's Me. She was signed to represent Reebok. Pagano stated in a 2004 interview with Vainquer Teens Magazine that she was in the process of recording a new album, but did not release any new material until 2008.

She appeared as a cartoon version of herself in the What's New, Scooby-Doo? episode "Riva Ras Regas", originally aired on Kids' WB on November 2, 2002. She performed three songs. In 2002, she became known as the AOL Girl due to her song being picked for their national commercials.

Pagano signed up as the first artist on The Matrix's label Let's Hear It Records, but the label closed before Pagano released any of her material.

Pagano is of Italian and Jewish descent. She resides in Philadelphia.

In 2009, Pagano began to release new songs via YouTube. In 2014, she announced on Twitter that she auditioned for the sixth season of The Voice. She performed on the show under Team Shakira for 3 episodes. (2021) Lindsay Pagano is now the newest member of the band Big House Band, performing along the East coast full time.

The Voice
On the third episode of the Blind Auditions broadcast on March 3, 2014, she performed Labelle's song "Lady Marmalade." Only Shakira turned her chair, thus she defaulted to Team Shakira.

Discography

Albums
 (TBA Untitled Album) (2009)
I Gotta Stop
Three Wishes
You Have No Right
I Go Down
What Did I Do
Seventeen Ways
Tough Enough

 Love & Faith & Inspiration (2001)
Everything U R
Love & Faith & Inspiration
Cryin' Shame
Romeo
Dreams Like This
Amazing High
It Doesn't Get Any Better
Burning in Me
Number One (With A Bullet)
So Bad (featuring Paul McCartney)
Love & Faith & Inspiration (Reprise)

Singles
* Everything U R (2001)
"Everything U R"
"Everything U R" (Philly Mix)
"Burning in Me"

2009
"I Gotta Stop" (Radio Only)

External links

Lindsay Pagano at IMDB
Lindsay Pagano at SEO Locale
Stellar Mojo
Big House Band
Lindsay Pagano on MySpace
Lindsay Pagano on Instagram 
Lindsay Pagano on Twitter
Lindsay Pagano on YouTube
Lindsay Pagano on SoundCloud

References

1986 births
Living people
21st-century American singers
The Voice (franchise) contestants
American child singers
American people of Italian descent
Jewish American musicians
Musicians from Philadelphia
Singers from Pennsylvania
Jewish rock musicians
21st-century American women singers
21st-century American Jews